The 2003 IAAF World Outdoor Meetings was the first edition of the annual global series of one-day track and field competitions organized by the International Association of Athletics Federations (IAAF). It replaced the IAAF Grand Prix as the IAAF's primary outdoor track and field series. Compared to the 2002 IAAF Grand Prix, a new tier of meetings – IAAF Super Grand Prix – was introduced and the IAAF Permit Meetings concept was dropped. The series had four levels: 2003 IAAF Golden League, Super Grand Prix, Grand Prix and Grand Prix II. There were 6 Golden League meetings, Super Grand Prix category featured 7 meetings from 12 June to 8 August, the IAAF Grand Prix category featured 10 meetings from 4 May to 7 September and Grand Prix II featured 11 meetings from 1 March to 3 August, making a combined total of 34 meetings for the series.

The Herculis meeting was dropped from the Golden League circuit as it was given the role of host of the new series-ending IAAF World Athletics Final, which had an expanded programme of events compared to the IAAF Grand Prix Final of previous years. The changes to the tiers of the series saw the meeting schedule expanded by nearly 50%. The Super Grand Prix meetings saw two new additions to the circuit (Golden Spike Ostrava and the Meeting de Madrid) with the other five being former Grand Prix meetings. At the Grand Prix level, the sole new introduction was the Meeting Lille-Métropole (formerly an IAAF Permit Meeting) which was supplemented by existing Grand Prix level meetings and the promotion of the Fanny Blankers-Koen Games, Meeting de Atletismo Sevilla, Grand Prix Zagreb, Gugl-Meeting, Asics GP Helsinki and the Rieti Meeting from Grand Prix II status. The Grand Prix II meetings were mostly upgraded IAAF Permit Meetings (Meeting du Conseil General de la Martinique, Notturna di Milano, Memorial Primo Nebiolo, Brothers Znamensky Memorial, Josef Odložil Memorial, KBC Night of Athletics and International Meeting Thessaloniki) with four pre-existing GPII meetings retaining that status.

Four meetings changed venue from 2002: the Grand Prix Brasil de Atletismo was moved from Rio de Janeiro to Belém and the Tsiklitiria meeting was moved from Athens to Tríkala, the second British meeting moved from Sheffield to Gateshead, and the Oregon Track Classic moved from Portland to Gresham, Oregon. Despite the expansion of the series schedule, two meetings lost Grand Prix status: the Engen Grand Prix in Pretoria and the Qatar Athletic Grand Prix in Doha (which was not held that year).

Performances on designated events on the circuit earned athletes points which qualified them for entry to the 2003 IAAF World Athletics Final, held on 13–14 September in Monaco. This competition replaced the IAAF Grand Prix Final, with the key difference being that the new final held a full set of track and field events, rather than the rotating partial event schedule of the Grand Prix Final. The points scoring format of previous years was replaced with a world rankings system which scored athletes on both their finishing position at qualifying meetings and also the standard of their performance based on IAAF Scoring Tables. The world rankings system formed the selection criteria for entry to the World Athletics Final rather than exclusively placings at IAAF Grand Prix meetings.

Meetings

References

2003
IAAF Grand Prix